The Intransigent Party is a leftist political party in Argentina, founded in 1963 by Oscar Alende. Its membership came from the Intransigent Radical Civic Union, one of the two factions of the Radical Civic Union.

History
The party was for a long time allied with Peronism in elections. Alende was presidential candidate in 1963, 1973, and 1983 without much success.

The party had its most successful period in 1985, becoming the third-largest party. It fell into oblivion after allying with the Justicialist Party from 1987.

The party was part of the FrePaSo coalition from the 1990s and entered government in 1999 as part of the Alianza between FrePaSo and the Radical Civic Union that brought Fernando de la Rúa to the presidency. The Alianza collapsed in 2001 and FrePaSo effectively disappeared.

For the 2003 Presidential Election, the Intransigent Party was allied to ARI, the party of Elisa Carrió, supporting her for President, and allowing her to be candidate (because her party did not have members in all the provinces). For 2005 legislative elections, the Intransigent Party allied with the Broad Front, Socialist Party and the Communist Party of Argentina, forming the coalition called Encuentro Amplio.

In 2007, the Party backed the Front for Victory and Cristina Fernández de Kirchner as candidate for President of Argentina.

The party is part of the Frente de Todos coalition that supported presidential candidate Alberto Fernández during the 2019 Argentine general election.

External links
Official web site

1972 establishments in Argentina
Democratic socialist parties in South America
Kirchnerism
Political parties established in 1972
Political parties in Argentina
Socialist parties in Argentina
Radical parties